The 2019–20 Gozo First Division (known as the BOV GFL First Division for sponsorship reasons) was the 73rd season of the Gozo Football League First Division, the highest division in Gozitan football. The season started on 20 September 2019. Victoria Hotspurs were the defending champions after winning their thirteenth title in the previous season.

The league season was suspended indefinitely on 30 March 2020 by the Malta Football Association (MFA) following the outbreak of the COVID-19 pandemic in Malta. On 25 May, the MFA council ratified the Gozo Football Association's decision to declare Nadur Youngsters as league champions based on sporting merits.

Teams 

Eight teams compete in the league – the top six teams from the previous season, the winner of the relegation play-off between the seventh-placed team and the second-placed team in the Second Division, and a promoted team from the Second Division. Second Division winner Xagħra United replaced Munxar Falcons.

League table

Results

Matches 1–14 

Teams play each other twice, once assigned as home and once away.

Matches 15–22 

Teams play every other team once (either assigned at home or away).

Season statistics

Top goalscorers

References 

Gozo First Division seasons
Gozo
5